This article is a list of notable people from Madrid, the capital of Spain:

Born in

Architecture and urban planning

 Teodoro Ardemans (1664–1726): Spanish architect
 José Benito de Churriguera (1665–1725) and Churriguera family: Spanish Baroque architects and sculptors; the highly decorated Churrigueresque style of architectural construction is named after the family
 Juan de Villanueva (1739–1811): Spanish architect of Neoclassicism
 Arturo Soria (1844–1920): Spanish urban planner, well known for his concept of the linear city
 Antonio González Echarte (1864–1943): Spanish civil engineer; one of the creators of the Madrid Metro 
 Carlos Mendoza y Sáez de Argandoña (1872–1950): Spanish civil engineer; one of the creators of the Madrid Metro
 Eduardo Torroja (1899–1961): Spanish structural engineer and architect

Army
 Pedro de Heredia (1505 – c. 1554): Spanish conquistador and founder of Cartagena de Indias
 Alonso de Contreras (1582–1648): Spanish privateer, a friend of Lope de Vega

Art music
 Dionisio Aguado y García (1784–1849): Spanish classical guitarist and composer
 Francisco Asenjo Barbieri (1823–1894): Spanish composer of the popular Spanish opera form, the zarzuela
 Federico Chueca (1846–1908):  Spanish composer of zarzuelas
 Conrado del Campo (1878–1953):  composer, violinist and professor at the Madrid Conservatory
 Teresa Berganza (1935–2022): Spanish mezzo-soprano
 Plácido Domingo (1941): international tenor and conductor
 Miguel Álvarez-Fernández (1979): Spanish sound artist, composer, theorist and curator

Bullfighting
 Luis Miguel Dominguín (1926–1996): Spanish bullfighter, a lover of Ava Gardner
 Julián López Escobar, El "Juli" (1982): Spanish bullfighter

Engineering
 Rafael del Pino (1920–2008): founder of the construction company Ferrovial
 Pedro Duque (1963): Spanish astronaut and aeronautical engineer

Finances
 Dimas Gimeno: former CEO of El Corte Inglés
 María Eugenia Girón: businesswoman
 Pablo Isla (1964): current chairman and CEO of Inditex
 Alicia Koplowitz (1954): Spanish noble and businesswoman
 Esther Koplowitz (1953): Spanish noble and businesswoman
 Juan Villalonga (1953): Spanish businessman

Formal sciences
Juan Caramuel y Lobkowitz (1606–1682):  Spanish Catholic scholastic philosopher, ecclesiastic, mathematician and writer

Literature
 Alonso de Ercilla (1533–1594): Spanish soldier and poet
 Félix Lope de Vega (1562–1635): Spanish Baroque playwright and poet; renewed the Spanish theatre at a time when it was starting to become a mass cultural phenomenon
 Tirso de Molina (1579–1648): Spanish Baroque playwright, poet and Roman Catholic monk, known as the creator of Don Juan
 Francisco de Quevedo (1580–1645): Spanish nobleman, politician and Baroque writer; his style is characterized by what was called conceptismo
 Pedro Calderon de la Barca (1600–1681): Spanish Baroque playwright and poet; his work is regarded as the culmination of the Spanish Baroque theatre
 Leandro Fernández de Moratín (1760–1828): Spanish playwright and poet
 Ramón de Mesonero Romanos (1803–1882): Spanish prose writer, author of Guía de Madrid (Madrid guide)
 Mariano José de Larra (1809–1837):  Spanish Romantic writer and journalist
 José Echegaray (1832–1916): Spanish engineer, mathematician and dramatist; Nobel Prize in Literature 1904
 Jacinto Benavente (1866–1954): Spanish dramatist, Nobel prize in Literature 1922
 Pedro Salinas (1891–1951):  Spanish poet, a member of the Generation of '27
 Dámaso Alonso (1898–1990): Spanish poet, philologist and literary critic
 Enrique Jardiel Poncela (1901–1952): Spanish playwright and novelist who wrote mostly humorous works
 Liboria o "Borita Casas" Casas Regueiro (1911–1999): journalist, playwright and author known for inventing the character Antoñita la Fantastica (Fantastic Antonia)
 Carlos Semprún (1926–2009), writer and dramatist
 Francisco Umbral (1932–2007): Spanish novelist, journalist, essayist and biographer

Media and entertainment
 Jesús Álvarez (1926–1970): Spanish journalist and first anchorman of Telediario
 Pablo Arbúes (born 2002): Spanish actor
 Jesús de Polanco (1929–2007): businessman; founder of El País and Cadena SER
 Belén Esteban (1973): Spanish television personality
 Matías Prats Luque (1952): Spanish sports and news journalist
 Paloma García Ovejero (1975): Spanish journalist and news broadcaster
 El Gran Wyoming (1955): Spanish humourist and actor
 Ana Rosa Quintana (1956): Spanish journalist and TV presenter
 David Cantolla (1967): founder of companies engaged in technology and entertainment; one of the creators of Pocoyo
 Ana Pastor (1977): Spanish journalist and anchorwoman
 Guillermo García Carsí (1974): director and creator of Pocoyo
 Santiago Ziesmer (1953): German voice actor
 Marian Rivera (born 1984): Filipino actress

Natural sciences
 Maslama al-Majriti (10th century – 1007 or 1008): Muslim astronomer
 Andrés Manuel del Río (1764–1849): Spanish-Mexican scientist and naturalist
 Ignacio Bolívar (1850–1944): Spanish naturalist and entomologist
 Gonzalo Rodriguez Lafora (1886–1971): Spanish neurologist
 Gregorio Marañón (1887–1960): Spanish physician, scientist, historian, writer and philosopher
 Carlos Jiménez Díaz (1898–1967): Spanish physician
 Manuel Díaz Rubio (1908–1976): Spanish physician; made important contributions in the field of liver and digestive diseases 
 Francisco J. Ayala (1934):  Spanish-American biologist and philosopher at the University of California, Irvine
 Antonio García-Bellido (1936): Spanish developmental biologist; his ideas and new approaches to the problem of development have been followed and pursued by many researchers worldwide
 Mariano Barbacid (1949): molecular biologist
 José Bermúdez de Castro (1952): Spanish anthropologist; a member of the research team investigating Pleistocene deposits in the Atapuerca Mountains 
 Juan Luis Arsuaga (1954): Spanish anthropologist; a member of the research team investigating Pleistocene deposits in the Atapuerca Mountains
 Ignacio Martínez Mendizábal (1961): Spanish anthropologist, a member of the research team investigating Pleistocene deposits in the Atapuerca Mountains

Philosophy
 Rocío Orsi (1976-2014): Spanish philosopher and professor
 José Ortega y Gasset (1883–1955): Spanish liberal philosopher

Politics
 Ruy Gonzáles de Clavijo (1370–1412): Castilian ambassador to the court of Timur
 Joanna la Beltraneja (1462–1530): Queen of Portugal and claimant to the throne of Castile
 Maria of Spain (1528–1603): spouse of Maximilian II, Holy Roman Emperor
 Antonio Perez (1540–1611): secretary of Philip II of Spain
 Philip III of Spain (1578–1621): Spanish Habsburg monarch
 Ferdinand VI of Spain (1713–1759): King of Spain
 Charles III of Spain (1716–1788): King of Spain, Naples (as Charles VII) and Sicily (as Charles V)
 Isabella II of Spain (1830–1904): Queen of Spain
 Alfonso XII of Spain (1857–1885): King of Spain
 Álvaro de Figueroa, 1st Count of Romanones (1863–1950): Prime Minister of Spain
 Francisco Largo (1869–1946): politician and trade unionist
 Julián Besteiro (1870–1940): socialist politician
 Tomás Dominguez, Carlist and Francoist politician
 Alfonso XIII of Spain (1886–1941): King of Spain
 Miguel Maura (1887–1971): politician
 Luis Jiménez (1889–1970): politician; president of Parliament
 José Antonio Primo de Rivera (1903–1936): Spanish lawyer, nobleman and politician; founder of Falange Española
 Adolfo Rincón de Arellano Garcia (1910–2006): politician
 Enrique Tierno Galván (1918–1986): Mayor of Madrid from 1978 to 1986
 Leopoldo Calvo-Sotelo (1926–2008): Spanish political figure and prime minister during the period of transition after the end of Francisco Franco's regime
 Javier Solana (1942): Spanish politician; appointed the High Representative of the Common Foreign and Security Policy of European Union and the Secretary-General of the Council of the European Union
 Rodrigo Rato (1949): managing director of the International Monetary Fund (IMF) from 2004 to 2007
 Esperanza Aguirre (1952): 3rd President of Madrid (2003–2012) and former president of the Spanish Senate (1999–2012)
 José María Aznar (1952): Prime Minister of Spain from 1996 to 2004
 Alberto Ruiz-Gallardón (1958): former Minister of Justice; former Mayor of Madrid (2003–2011)
 Philip VI of Spain (1968): current king of Spain
 Pablo Iglesias Turrión (1978): Spanish political scientist and leader of Podemos

Popular music
 María Dolores Pradera (1924–2018): Spanish singer and actress
 Fina de Calderón (1927–2010): Spanish writer, poet, songwriter and musician
 Julio Iglesias (1943): Spanish singer and songwriter who has sold over 300 million records worldwide
 Rocío Durcal (1944–2006): Spanish singer and actress
 Massiel (1947): Spanish pop singer; winner of the Eurovision Song Contest 1968
 Rosendo Mercado (born 1954), rock singer and songwriter
 Antonio Vega (1957–2009): Spanish pop singer-songwriter; member of Nacha Pop
 Antonio Flores (1961–1995): Spanish singer-songwriter and actor
 Alejandro Sanz (1968): Spanish singer-songwriter and musician
 Los Chichos (1973–1995, 1990–2008): Spanish rumba band
 Enrique Iglesias (1975): Spanish singer-songwriter, model, and actor
 Barón Rojo (1980): Spanish heavy metal band
 Mecano (1981–1992): Spanish pop band
 Hombres G (1982–1992; 2002–present): Spanish pop-rock band
 Mägo de Oz (1988): Spanish rock and folk/heavy metal band
 Belinda (1989): Mexican singer, songwriter and actress
 Quevedo (born 2001), rapper

Religion
 Saint Isidro Labrador (1070–1130): Catholic patron saint of farmers and Madrid
 Juan Eusebio Nieremberg (1595–1658): Spanish Jesuit and mystic
 Álvaro del Portillo (1914–1992): former prelate of the Opus Dei

Scenic arts
 María Calderón, "La Calderona" (1611–1646): Spanish theatre actress and lover of Philip IV of Spain
 María Guerrero (1867–1928): Spanish theatre actress, producer and director
 Edgar Neville (1899–1967):  Spanish playwright and film director, a member of the Generation of '27
Antonio Castillo (1908–1984): Academy Award winning costume designer
 Juan Antonio Bardem (1922–2002): Spanish screenwriter and film director
 César Fernández Ardavín (1923–2012): Spanish film director and screenwriter; won the Golden Bear at the 10th Berlin International Film Festival
 Lina Morgan (1936–2015), Spanish actress & comedienne
 José Luis Garci (1944): Spanish director, won the Academy Award for Best Foreign Language Film in 1982
 Carmen Maura (1945): Spanish actress; has collaborated with Pedro Almodóvar in several times
 Emilio Martínez Lázaro (1945): Spanish film director; shared a Golden Bear at the 28th Berlin International Film Festival
 María Kosti (1951): Spanish actress
 Fernando Trueba (1955): Spanish director; won the Academy Award for Best Foreign Language Film in 1994
 Belén Rueda (1962): Spanish actress, known for her roles as Julia in The Sea Inside (2004) and as Laura in The Orphanage (2007)
 Santiago Segura (1965): Spanish film actor, screenwriter, producer and director
 Maribel Verdú (1970): Spanish actress
 Elsa Pataky (1976): Spanish & Australian actress & model
 Amarna Miller (1990): former Spanish porn actress
 Nathalia Ramos (1992): Spanish & American actress; born/lived in Madrid for two years

Social sciences
 Margarita María Birriel Salcedo (born 1953): professor, expert in women's history and women's studies
 Juan Lopez de Hoyos (1511–1583): Spanish schoolmaster and Miguel de Cervantes' teacher
 Claudio Sánchez Albornoz (1893–1984): Spanish historian
 Manuel Tuñón de Lara (1915–1987): Spanish historian
 Pio Filippani Ronconi (1920–2010): Italian orientalist
 Jesús Huerta de Soto (1956): economist

Sports
 Antonio Rebollo (born 1955): Paralympic archery 
 José Navarro Morenés (1897–1974): Spanish horse rider
 Luis González Maté (born 1931): retired Spanish boxer
 Luis Aragonés (1938–2014): former Spanish footballer and national coach
 Manolo Santana (1938–2021): former amateur tennis champion
 Florentino Pérez (born 1957): Spanish businessman, civil engineer, former politician; current president of Real Madrid C.F., and Grupo ACS
 Begoña Gómez Martín (born 1964): Olympic judoka
 Carlos Sainz (born 1962): Spanish rally driver
 Fernando Martín Espina (1962–1989): Spanish basketball player
 Emilio Butragueño (born 1963): Spanish retired footballer
 Pedro García Aguado (1968): former water polo player; current psychologist
 Jesús Ángel García (born 1969): Spanish race walker
 Mario Gimeno (born 1969): Spanish retired footballer
 Rafael Pascual, "El Toro" (1970): Spanish volleyball player
 Raúl González (1977): professional football player
 Estela Giménez (1979): retired rhythmic gymnast
 Gonzalo Fernández-Castaño (1980): professional golfer
 Alberto Falcón (born 1970): former professional fencer
 Gabi Fernández (born 1983): professional footballer
 Fernando Verdasco (1983): professional tennis player
 Coke Andújar (1987): professional footballer
 David De Gea (1990): professional football player
 Javier Fernández López (1991): professional figure skater, 2018 Olympic games bronze medalist, double world champion (2015, 2016), 7-times European champion.
 Koke Resurrección (born 1992): professional footballer
 Adrián Mateos (1994): professional poker player
 Carlos Sainz Jr. (born 1994): Spanish Formula One racing driver

Visual arts
 Sebastián Herrera Barnuevo (1611–1616): Spanish painter, architect and sculptor
 Francisco Camilo (1615–1673): Spanish Baroque painter
 Francisco Rizi (1608–1615):  Spanish Baroque painter
 Francisco de Solís (1620–1645): Spanish Baroque painter
 Claudio Coello (1642–1693): Spanish Baroque painter
 Eduardo Rosales (1836–1873): Spanish realist painter
 José Gutiérrez Solana (1886–1945): Spanish expressionist painter and printmaker
 Juan Gris (1887–1927): international artist of Cubism
 Lucio Muñoz (1929–1998): Spanish abstract painter and engraver
 Eduardo Arroyo (1937–2018):  Spanish painter and graphic artist
 Juan Muñoz (1953–2001): Spanish sculptor, working primarily in papier-mâché, resin and bronze
 Ouka Leele (1957–2022): Spanish photographer
 Chema Madoz (1958): Spanish photographer, best known for his black and white surrealist photography
 Muelle (1966–1995): Spanish graffiti pioneer

Others
 María Cayetana de Silva (1762–1802): 13th Duchess of Alba
 Manuela Malasaña (1791–1808): one of the townspeople who lost their lives during the Dos de Mayo Uprising against the troops of Napoleon I of France during the Peninsular War
 Enma Iranzo Martín (1959): pharmaceutical biochemist and Spanish politician
 Agatha Ruiz de la Prada (1960): Spanish designer

Other influential people who have lived in Madrid

Architecture and urban planning
 Juan de Herrera (1530–1597): Spanish architect, mathematician and geometrician
 Filippo Juvarra (1678–1736): Italian architect and stage set designer
 Ventura Rodríguez (1717–1785): Spanish architect and artist
 Francesco Sabatini (1722–1897): Italian architect
 Antonio Palacios (1872–1945): Spanish architect
 Miguel Otamendi (1878–1958): Spanish civil engineer, known for being one of the creators of the Madrid Metro

Army
 Don John of Austria (1545–1578): illegitimate son of Holy Roman Emperor Charles V, best known for his victory at the Battle of Lepanto

Engineering
 Leonardo Torres y Quevedo (1852–1936): Spanish civil engineer and mathematician

Finances
 Ramón Areces Rodríguez (1905–1989): Spanish businessman and founder of El Corte Inglés
 Emilio Botín (1934–2014): Spanish banker; former Executive Chairman of Spain's Grupo Santander

Formal sciences
 Grégoire de Saint-Vincent (1584–1667): Flemish Jesuit mathematician
 Jean-Charles de la Faille (1597–1652): Flemish Jesuit mathematician
 Johann Baptist Cysat (1587–1657):  Swiss Jesuit mathematician and astronomer
 Hugh Sempill (between 1589 and 1596 – 1654):  Scottish Jesuit mathematician and linguist

Literature
 Miguel de Cervantes (1547–1616): Spanish novelist, poet and playwright; soldier; his magnum opus, Don Quixote, is the first modern European novel
 Luis de Góngora (1561–1627): Spanish Baroque lyric poet
 Manuel de Faria e Sousa (1590–1649): Portuguese poet and historian
 Miguel Unamuno (1864–1936): Spanish essayist, novelist, poet, playwright, philosopher; Greek professor and later rector at the University of Salamanca
 Pío Baroja (1872–1956): Spanish Basque writer, one of the key novelists of the Generation of '98
 Vicente Aleixandre (1889–1984): Spanish poet, Nobel Prize in Literature 1977
 Federico García Lorca (1898–1936): Spanish poet, dramatist and theatre director
 Ernest Hemingway (1899–1961): American author and journalist
 Camilo José Cela (1916–2002): Spanish novelist and short story writer, Nobel Prize in Literature 1989
 Mario Vargas Llosa (1936): Peruvian-Spanish writer, politician, journalist, essayist, and recipient of the 2010 Nobel Prize in Literature

Media and entertainment
 Torcuato Luca de Tena (1861–1929): Spanish journalist, founder of the ABC newspaper
 Matías Prats Cañete (1913–2004): Spanish radio and television journalist

Music
 Domenico Scarlatti (1685–1757): Italian composer; spent much of his life in the service of the Portuguese and Spanish royal families
 Luigi Boccherini (1743–1805): Italian classical era composer
 Tomás Bretón (1850–1923): Spanish musician and composer of zarzuelas
 Lola Flores (1923–1995): Spanish singer, dancer and actress
 Joaquín Sabina (1949): Spanish singer, songwriter, and poet
 José Antonio Bowen (born 1952): American jazz musician and president of Goucher College
 Nacho Canut (1957): bass player and one of the main composers (along with Alaska) of the bands Alaska y los Pegamoides, Alaska y Dinarama and Fangoria
 Loquillo (1960): Spanish rock singer and founder of Loquillo y Trogloditas
 Alaska (1963): Spanish-Mexican singer, DJ, and TV personality; one of the main characters in the so-called Movida
 Shakira (1977): Colombian singer-songwriter, dancer and model
 Sharon Corr (1970): Irish singer-songwriter, musician and television personality, member of The Corrs

Natural sciences
 Alexius Sylvius Polonus (1593–1653): Polish Jesuit astronomer and maker of astronomical instruments
 Santiago Ramón y Cajal (1852–1934): Spanish pathologist, histologist, neuroscientist, and Nobel laureate (1906)
 Severo Ochoa (1905–1933): Spanish–American Doctor of Medicine and Biochemist, and joint winner of the 1959 Nobel Prize in Physiology or Medicine

Philosophy
 Baltasar Gracián (1601–1658): Spanish Jesuit and baroque prose writer and philosopher; his proto-existentialist writings were lauded by Nietzsche and Schopenhauer
 María Zambrano (1904–1991): Spanish essayist and philosopher

Politics
 Philip II of Spain (1527–1598): Habsburg King of Spain and Portugal; during his reign, Spain reached the height of its influence and power
 Count-Duke of Olivares (1587–1645): Spanish royal favourite of Philip IV; minister
 Philip IV of Spain (1605–1665): King of Spain and Portugal (as Philip III)
 Philip V of Spain (1683–1743): first Spanish King of the House of Bourbon
 Elizabeth Farnese (1692–1766): Queen of Spain as the wife of King Philip V, and de facto ruler of Spain from 1714 until 1746
 Joseph Bonaparte (1768–1844): elder brother of Napoleon Bonaparte, King of Spain (1808–1813, as José I)
 Simón Bolivar (1783–1830): Venezuelan military and political leader; played a key role in Hispanic America's successful struggle for independence from the Spanish Empire
 Ferdinand VII of Spain (1784–1833): Spanish monarch
 Baldomero Espartero (1793–1879): Spanish general and political figure; associated with the radical (or progressive) wing of Spanish liberalism and would become their symbol and champion after taking credit for the victory over the Carlists in 1839
 Leopoldo O'Donnell (1808–1867): Spanish general and statesman
 Francisco Pi y Margall (1824–1901): liberal Spanish statesman and romanticist writer; was briefly president of the short-lived First Spanish Republic in 1873
 Práxedes Mateo Sagasta (1825–1903): Prime Minister of Spain during the Spanish–American War of 1898 (during which time Spain lost its remaining colonies), and founder of the Liberal Party
 Antonio Cánovas del Castillo (1828–1897): Spanish politician and historian, known principally for serving six terms as Spanish Prime Minister
 Emilio Castelar y Ripoll (1832–1899): Spanish republican politician, and a president of the First Spanish Republic
 Amadeo I of Spain (1845–1890): the only King of Spain from the House of Savoy
 José Rizal (1861–1896): Filipino nationalist and revolutionary
 Francisco Franco (1892–1975): Spanish dictator from 1939 to 1975
 Pablo Iglesias (1887–1927): Spanish socialist and labour leader, founder of the Spanish Socialist Workers' Party (PSOE) and the Spanish General Worker's Union (UGT)
 Manuel Azaña (1880–1940): first Prime Minister of the Second Spanish Republic (1931–1933)
 Juan Perón (1895–1974): Argentine military officer and politician
 Carlos Lopez-Cantera (1973): Lieutenant Governor of the U.S. State of Florida (2014–2019)
 Santiago Carrillo (1915–2012): general secretary of the Communist Party of Spain (PCE) from 1960 to 1981
 Manuel Fraga Iribarne (1922–2012): Spanish People's Party politician
 Adolfo Suárez (1932-2014): Spain's first democratically elected prime minister after the dictatorship of Francisco Franco, and the key figure in the country's transition to democracy
 Simeon II of Bulgaria (1937): important political and royal figure in Bulgaria
 Juan Carlos I of Spain (1938): King of Spain from 1975 to 2014
 Queen Sofía of Spain (1938): Queen consort and wife of King Juan Carlos I of Spain
 Felipe González (1942):  Prime Minister of Spain, after having served four successive mandates from 1982 to 1996
 Josep Antoni Duran i Lleida (1952): Minister of Governance and Institutional Relations of the Generalitat de Catalunya
 Mariano Rajoy (1955): current Prime Minister of Spain, elected on 21 December 2011
 José Luis Rodríguez Zapatero (1960): Prime Minister of Spain from 2004 to 2011

Religion
 Josemaría Escrivá (1902–1975):  Roman Catholic priest from Spain and founder of Opus Dei

Scenic arts
 Luis Buñuel (1900–1983): Aragonese filmmaker who worked in Spain, Mexico and France
 Fernando Fernán Gómez (1921–2007): Spanish actor, screenwriter, film director, theater director and member of the Royal Spanish Academy
 Sara Montiel (1928–2013): Spanish singer and actress
 Alfredo Landa (1933–2013): Spanish actor; winner of Best Actor Award (Cannes Film Festival 1984)
 Pedro Almodóvar (1949): Spanish film director, screenwriter and producer; member of the American Academy of Arts and Sciences since 2001
 Javier Bardem (1969): Spanish actor; won the Academy Award for Best Supporting Actor in 2007
 Alejandro Amenábar (1972): Chilean-Spanish film director, screenwriter and composer; won the Academy Award for Best Foreign Language Film in 2005

Social sciences
 Beatriz Galindo, "La Latina" (1465?–1534): Spanish physician and educator; writer, humanist and a teacher of Queen Isabella of Castile and her children
 Francisco Giner de los Ríos (1839–1915):  Spanish philosopher, educator; one of the most influential Spanish intellectuals at the end of the 19th and the beginning of the 20th century
 Ramón Menéndez Pidal (1869–1968):  Spanish philologist and historian

Sports
 Santiago Bernabéu Yeste (1895–1978): former president of Real Madrid C.F.
 Vicente Calderón (1913–1987): Spanish businessman and president of Atlético Madrid for twenty years

Visual arts
 Vincenzo Carducci (1598–1638): Italian painter
 Francisco de Zurbarán (1598–1664): Spanish Baroque painter
 Diego Velázquez (1599–1660): Spanish Baroque painter, important as a portrait artist
 Giambattista Tiepolo (1696–1770): Italian painter and printmaker
 Anton Raphael Mengs (1728–1779): German painter
 Francisco Goya (1746–1828): Spanish Romantic painter and printmaker, regarded both as the last of the Old Masters and the first of the moderns
 Federico de Madrazo (1815–1894): Spanish realist painter
 Juan Luna (1857–1899): Filipino painter, sculptor and a political activist of the Philippine Revolution
 Pablo Picasso (1881–1973): Spanish painter, sculptor, printmaker, ceramicist, and stage designer; spent most of his adult life in France
 Salvador Dalí (1904–1989): Spanish Catalan surrealist painter
 Francis Bacon (1909–1992): Irish-born British figurative painter
 Fernando Botero (1932): Colombian figurative artist and sculptor; considered the most recognized and quoted living artist from Latin America
 Antonio López García (1936): Spanish painter and sculptor
 Carmen Cervera (1943): Spanish philanthropist, socialite and art dealer and collector

References

External links

 
Madrid-related lists
Madrid